Andrés García Robledo (born 7 February 2003) is a Spanish footballer who plays as a left winger for Atlético Levante UD.

Club career
Born in Valencia, García joined Levante UD's youth setup in 2021, from CF Inter San José, and was initially assigned to the Juvenil side of CF Torre Levante. Back to the Granotes in July 2022, he was assigned to the reserves in Tercera Federación.

García made his senior debut with the B-team on 10 September 2022, starting in a 1–0 home loss against Torrent CF, and scored his first goal on 6 November by netting the winner in a 1–0 home success over Elche CF Ilicitano. He made his first team debut the following 3 January, coming on as a late substitute for Álex Cantero in a 3–2 home win over Getafe CF, for the season's Copa del Rey.

References

External links

2003 births
Living people
Footballers from Valencia (city)
Spanish footballers
Association football wingers
Tercera Federación players
Atlético Levante UD players
Levante UD footballers